The Egyptian Federation of American Football  was founded in 2014.  It was granted full membership by the IFAF in 2014. EFAF is the country's top league, composed of 6 teams. The country's national team had its first match on 13 December 2014 against the Moroccan national team at the GUC stadium, for qualifications for the 2015 IFAF World Championship, and lost 26-6.

History

Founding and Membership of IFAF
The Egyptian Federation of American Football (EFAF) was founded in 2014 and it is the governing body for the sport of American football in Egypt. It's responsible for all regulatory, competition, performance, and development aspects of the game. Egypt was granted full IFAF membership in 2014 at the IFAF congress in Kuwait.

The Egyptian National team of American football
It is the country's official senior national men's football team. It is controlled by ELAF and is recognized by the International Federation of American Football (IFAF). ELAF is a full member of the International Federation of American Football The Egyptian League of American Football offers full-contact football in Egypt.

The Egyptian League of American Football

Teams

ELAF comprises six teams:
 
Cairo Sharks : Founding team, started in 2012 and the Pharaohs bowl winner of 2013. Jersey colors: and  

BUE Hawks  : The British University in Egypt's team, started in 2014.  Jersey colors: and  

Cairo Lions : Started in 2014, the Cairo Lions are an independent team.  Jersey colors: and  

Cairo Mustangs   : Started in 2013, and converted into an independent team in 2015 . Jersey colors: and  

BUE Bulls : British University in Egypt  new team with name Bulls, soon to join. Jersey colors:

Cairo Gorillas :  A new team with the name Gorillas in 2015, which joined the ELAF starting the 2016 season. Jersey colors: and

Egyptian National team's IFAF World Championship record

International Federation of American Football
American football
American football in Egypt
Men's national American football teams
2013 establishments in Egypt
National sports teams established in 2013